Dichomeris dentata is a moth in the family Gelechiidae. It was described by Hou-Hun Li, Hui Zhen and Wolfram Mey in 2013. It is found in Malawi.

The wingspan is about 17 mm. The forewings are greyish brown, with dense dark brown scales distally and a dark brown fascia from the upper middle of the cell to the middle of the fold, becoming a rounded spot at the fold. The hindwings are grey.

Etymology
The species name refers to the teeth on the inner side of the sicae distally and is derived from Latin dentatus (meaning toothlike).

References

Moths described in 2013
dentata